Gabriel Dal Toé Busanello (born 29 October 1998), known as Gabriel Busanello or just Busanello, is a Brazilian footballer who plays as a left back for Malmö FF.

Club career

Early career
Born in Frederico Westphalen, Rio Grande do Sul, Busanello was an União Frederiquense youth graduate. Promoted to the main squad in July 2015, he made his senior debut on 6 September of that year, starting in a 3–1 Copa Serrana home win against Gaúcho.

Busanello featured in six matches for the club in the Copa Serrana, as his side was crowned champions.

Chapecoense
In August 2016, after impressing during the 2016 Campeonato Gaúcho Série A2, Busanello agreed to a contract with Chapecoense. After being called up to the main squad for the 2017 season by new manager Vagner Mancini, he made his first team debut on 9 February 2017, starting in a 0–2 away loss against Cruzeiro in the Primeira Liga.

Busanello subsequently returned to the youth setup before rejoining União Frederiquense on 16 January 2019, on loan until the end of the Gaúcho Série A2. On 2 May, he moved to Hercílio Luz also in a temporary deal, but left in the following month to join Pelotas also on loan.

Busanello returned to Chape in May 2020, and was initially a backup to Alan Ruschel during the 2020 Série B. After Ruschel tested positive for COVID-19, Busanello started to appear regularly in the main squad, and renewed his contract until 2022 on 11 November.

Career statistics

Honours
União Frederiquense
Copa Serrana: 2015

Chapecoense
Campeonato Catarinense: 2017, 2020
Campeonato Brasileiro Série B: 2020

Pelotas
Copa FGF: 2019
Recopa Gaúcha: 2020

References

External links
Chapecoense official profile 

1998 births
Living people
Sportspeople from Rio Grande do Sul
Brazilian footballers
Association football defenders
Campeonato Brasileiro Série A players
Campeonato Brasileiro Série B players
Associação Chapecoense de Futebol players
Hercílio Luz Futebol Clube players
Esporte Clube Pelotas players
SC Dnipro-1 players
Esporte Clube Juventude players
Brazilian expatriate footballers
Ukrainian Premier League players
Expatriate footballers in Ukraine
Brazilian expatriate sportspeople in Ukraine